David Litvinov (born 23 September 1993) is an Israeli weightlifter. He represented Israel at the 2020 Summer Olympics in Tokyo, Japan.

Career
He competed in the men's +105 kg event at the 2017 Summer Universiade held in Taipei, Taiwan and the men's +105 kg event at the 2017 World Weightlifting Championships held in Anaheim, United States. He also competed in the men's +109 kg event at the 2018 World Weightlifting Championships held in Ashgabat, Turkmenistan and the men's +109 kg event at the 2019 World Weightlifting Championships held in Pattaya, Thailand.

He competed at several editions of the European Weightlifting Championships: he competed in the men's +105 kg event at the 2014 European Weightlifting Championships in Israel, Tel Aviv, at the 2016 European Weightlifting Championships in Førde, Norway, at the 2017 European Weightlifting Championships in Split, Croatia and the 2018 European Weightlifting Championships in Bucharest, Romania. He also competed in the men's +109 kg event at the 2021 European Weightlifting Championships in Moscow, Russia.

In 2020, he won the bronze medal in the men's +109kg event at the Roma 2020 World Cup in Rome, Italy.

Fernando Reis of Brazil had qualified to compete in the men's +109 kg event at the 2020 Summer Olympics in Tokyo, Japan but he was suspended after testing positive for human growth hormone. He was replaced by Litvinov less than a week before the opening ceremony of the 2020 Summer Olympics. Litvinov finished in 11th place with a total of 381 kg.

Achievements

References

External links
 
 
 
 
 

Living people
1993 births
Place of birth missing (living people)
Israeli male weightlifters
Competitors at the 2017 Summer Universiade
Weightlifters at the 2020 Summer Olympics
Olympic weightlifters of Israel
21st-century Israeli people